Dira swanepoeli, or Swanepoel's widow, is a butterfly of the family Nymphalidae. It is found in the southern slopes of the Blouberg Range in Limpopo, South Africa.

The wingspan is 58–65 mm for males and 60–68 mm for females. Adults are on wing from late February to early March. There is one generation per year.

The larvae feed on various Poaceae species, including Eragrostis aspera, Ehrharta erecta and Pennisetum clandestinum.

Subspecies
Dira swanepoeli swanepoeli (northern Transvaal)
Dira swanepoeli isolata van Son, 1955 (Blouberg Range in northern Transvaal)

References

Butterflies described in 1939
Satyrini